Vern Ralph Smith (8 May 1891 - 27 Oct 1978) was an American left wing journalist who served in an editorial capacity for several publications of the Industrial Workers of the World and the Communist Party USA (CPUSA). Smith is best remembered as the Moscow correspondent of the CPUSA's The Daily Worker during the middle-1930s.

Background
Smith was born May 8, 1892, in Alila, California, the son of a dairy farmer. He attended public school in Tulare County and graduated as the valedictorian of his class. Smith was also editor of his high school newspaper, a career skill which would ultimately serve him well in life. Smith, one of 4 children, spent his youth working on the family farm in the San Joaquin Valley, leaving for university at the age of 20.

Smith attended the University of California at Berkeley, from which he graduated in 1916 with a Bachelor's degree in Economics. While at Berkeley, Smith was the secretary of his school's chapter of the Intercollegiate Socialist Society and president of the California International Cosmopolitan Club.

Career

During the years of First World War, Smith was a Second Lieutenant of the infantry in the Officers' Reserve, but was never ordered to active duty.

Smith worked variously as a farm hand, construction worker, and storekeeper.

Wobbly
Smith travelled east, working a job in the Kansas wheat fields. In 1921 he joined the Industrial Workers of the World (IWW) as a member of Agricultural Workers' Industrial Union, No. 110. He later followed the harvest to Canada, before heading for Seattle, Washington, where he became editor of the IWW's west coast newspaper, The Industrial Worker.

Smith joined the local "Marxian Club" in Seattle in 1922. Smith later recalled:    "I read Marx's Capital and decided that the Communists probably had the right idea and joined the Marxian Club. This club was a legal group in Seattle under the influence of the underground Communist Parties. I never got into the underground movement, but went with the club into the Workers Party when the club joined the Party in a body immediately after the organization of the Workers Party [in December 1921]."      Smith was one of three key members of the IWW to join the Communist movement, the others being Elizabeth Gurley Flynn and Harrison George.

Communist

When the IWW turned against the Communists in 1922, Smith remained in the union under the direction of the Workers Party in Seattle. Smith remained as editor of the paper until June 1923, at which time the IWW sent him to Chicago to edit the organization's primary English-language newspaper, Industrial Solidarity. He was also the assistant manage of the IWW's Educational Bureau in 1924.

Smith was exposed as a secret member of the Workers (Communist) Party in 1926 and fired from his position as editor of Industrial Solidarity. He was immediately taken onto the staff of the Communist Party's daily newspaper, The Daily Worker, also published in Chicago at the time.

When the paper moved to New York City in 1927, Smith moved with it, remaining on the staff for the rest of the 1920s and throughout most of the 1930s, save for a 7-month period when he was made editor of Labor Unity, the monthly magazine of the Trade Union Unity League, an affiliate of the Communist Party.  In 1927, Smith drew up a petition to have the paper's editor J. Louis Engdahl removed; most of the staff signed it (including Harry Freeman (journalist), Sender Garlin, and Whittaker Chambers).

In 1931-2 Smith was dispatched to Harlan County, Kentucky by The Daily Worker to cover the Harlan County War coal mine strikes.  Smith was arrested along with a number of strike organizers and relief workers, and was incarcerated for four months in the Harlan County jail, the last 31 days of which were in solitary confinement.

In August 1933, Smith replaced Nathaniel Buchwald as Moscow correspondent of The Daily Worker During his stint there, he wrote two books highly favorable to the Soviet system, one dealing with coal miners in the Donets Basin and the other with workers in the Ukrainian collective farm village of Starosellye, Ukraine.

Smith returned to California after his time in Moscow, as labor editor and foreign editor of the CP's California newspaper, the Daily People's World. He also taught in San Francisco at the Tom Mooney Labor School, a Communist Party educational project.

Smith was expelled from the Communist Party in 1946 during the party's crackdown on so-called anti-revisionist left wing factional dissidents. Others included in this factional expulsion were Sam Darcy, William F. Dunne, and Smith's fellow editor at the Daily People's World, Harrison George. At least one contemporary memoirist has indicated that the core reason for this purge related to a bitter inner-Party battle among left wing members of the Machinists' Union embroiled in a bitter strike in San Francisco.

Personal life and death
Whittaker Chambers described Smith as a Stalinist and Fosterite in the late 1920s.

Vern Smith died age 87 on October 27, 1978, in Alameda, California.

Legacy
Vern Smith's papers, primarily relating to his time as a member of the IWW, are located at the Kheel Center for Labor-Management Documentation and Archives in the Martin P. Catherwood Library at Cornell University in Ithaca, New York.

References

Works

Books, Pamphlets
 The Frame-up System. New York: International Publishers, 1930.
 Miners in the Donbas. Moscow: Co-operative Publishing Society of Foreign Workers in the USSR, 1935.
 In a Collective Farm Village. Moscow: Co-operative Publishing Society of Foreign Workers in the USSR, 1936.
 History of the American Labor Movement, 1700-1943. San Francisco: Tom Mooney Labor School, n.d. [c. 1943].

Articles
 "The Roosevelt Program of Attack upon the Working Class," The Communist International, vol. 10 (September 15, 1933), pp. 596–603.
 "Beginnings of Revolutionary Political Action in the USA," The Communist, vol. 12, no. 10 (October 1933), pp. 1039–1054.
 "Farmer-Labour Party Developments," International Press Correspondence, vol. 16 (May 16, 1936), pp. 626–627.
 "Trotsky Will Not Win American Labour," International Press Correspondence, vol. 17 (February 27, 1937), pp. 250–251.

External links
 "Guide to the Vern Smith, Collector. Industrial Workers of the World Files, 1916-1935," Kheel Center for Labor-Management Documentation and Archives, Cornell University. Retrieved February 19, 2010.

1890s births
American socialists
American Marxists
Industrial Workers of the World members
Members of the Communist Party USA
American newspaper editors
Year of death missing